Karyn Faure (born 5 May 1969) is a French swimmer. She competed in the women's 800 metre freestyle at the 1988 Summer Olympics.

References

External links
 

1969 births
Living people
French female freestyle swimmers
Olympic swimmers of France
Swimmers at the 1988 Summer Olympics
Sportspeople from Cannes